Zawkrze, also Zawkrze Land, is a small historic region of Poland (ziemia), located in northern Mazovia, along the border with Masuria. Currently, Zawkrze has three towns, and more than 200 villages. Its name comes from the Wkra river – Zawkrze means the land behind the Wkra, from the perspective of Płock, the historic capital of Mazovia. The largest town of the region is Mława, while the historic capital of Zawkrze is Szreńsk. 

Zawkrze lies between the Wkra (in the south), Dzialdowka (in the west), Orzyca and Łydynia (in the east) rivers, and the former border with Prussia in the north. The northern border was established by the Treaty of Kalisz in 1343. Currently, Zawkrze is divided between five counties and two voivodeships - Mława, Żuromin, Ciechanów, Nidzica and Działdowo. It has three towns, Mława, Żuromin, Glinojeck, as well as three former towns – Kuczbork, Niedzbórz and Szreńsk. There is a sports club "Zawkrze" Mława, as well as a Museum of the Zawkrze Region, also in Mława. 

In the Middle Ages, Zawkrze was part of the Duchy of Plock. From 1384 to 1399 and from 1407 to 1411, Zawkrze was pawned to the Teutonic Knights by Duke of Mazovia, Siemowit IV. In 1494, during the reign of King Jan Olbracht, Zawkrze was annexed by the Kingdom of Poland, in which it was part of Plock Voivodeship. It was divided into three counties (Szreńsk, Mława and Niedzborz), and its boundaries remained unchanged until the Partitions of Poland. Following the second partition (1793), the northern part of Zawkrze was annexed by the Kingdom of Prussia, and in 1795, the whole Zawkrze became part of Prussia. From 1815 to 1918, Zawkrze belonged to Russian-controlled Congress Poland.

Sources 
 History of Zawkrze

External links 
 Webpage of the Zawkrze Museum in Mlawa

Masovia
Ziemias